Gambling on the High Seas is a 1940 American drama film remake of Special Agent (1935), directed by George Amy and written by Robert E. Kent. The film stars Wayne Morris, Jane Wyman, Gilbert Roland, John Litel, Roger Pryor and Frank Wilcox. The film was released by Warner Bros. on June 22, 1940 as a second feature.

Plot

A reporter tries to implicate a gambling-ship owner for murder.

Cast 
 Wayne Morris as Jim Carter
 Jane Wyman as Laurie Ogden
 Gilbert Roland as Greg Morella
 John Litel as U.S. District Attorney
 Roger Pryor as Max Gates
 Frank Wilcox as Stone
 Robert Strange as Larry Brill
 John Gallaudet as Steve Sterling 
 Frank Ferguson as City District Attorney
 Harry Shannon as Chief of Police
 George Reeves as Reporter
 George Meader as Secretary to City Attorney
 William Pawley as Frank
 Murray Alper as Louie

References

External links 
 
 
 
 

1940 films
1940 crime drama films
American black-and-white films
American crime drama films
Films about journalists
Films directed by George Amy
Films about gambling
Warner Bros. films
Remakes of American films
1940s English-language films
1940s American films